Philippine Assembly and local elections were held in the Philippines on June 4, 1912.

Results

See also
Commission on Elections
Politics of the Philippines
Philippine elections

External links
Official website of the Commission on Elections

1912
1912 elections in the Philippines